Philip Duggan (born 1933) is an Irish retired hurler who played for Mid Cork Championship club Grenagh, Dublin Championship club Civil Service and at inter-county level with the Cork senior hurling team. He usually lined out as a centre-back.

Duggan began his hurling career at club level with Grenagh. He enjoyed his greatest success with the club when he was part of the 1951 Cork Minor Championship-winning team. Duggan later joined the Civil Service club in Dublin, winning a Dublin Intermediate Championship in 1962.

At inter-county level, Duggan was part of the successful Cork minor team that won the All-Ireland Championship in 1951. He joined the Cork senior team in 1958. From his debut, Duggan was ever-present as a centre-back before later switching to midfield and made 8 Championship appearances in a career that ended with his last game in 1964.

At inter-provincial level, Duggan was selected to play in one championship campaigns with Munster, with his sole Railway Cup medal being won in 1961.

Honours

Grenagh
Cork Minor Hurling Championship (1): 1951

Civil Service
Dublin Intermediate Hurling Championship (1): 1962

Cork
All-Ireland Minor Hurling Championship (1): 1951
Munster Minor Hurling Championship (1): 1951

Munster
Railway Cup (1): 1961

References

1933 births
Living people
Grenagh hurlers
Civil Service hurlers
Cork inter-county hurlers
Munster hurlers